The Life of Carlos Gardel (Spanish: La vida de Carlos Gardel) is a 1939 Argentine musical film directed by Alberto de Zavalía and starring Hugo del Carril, Delia Garces and Elsa O'Connor. The premiered in Buenos Aires on May 24, 1939. The film is a biopic, portraying the life of the French-born tango singer Carlos Gardel (1890-1935) who became a popular film star in Argentina and the United States. The film was a major success, due largely to the lasting popularity of Gardel following his sudden death in an airplane crash four years before. The film boosted the careers of its stars, and was part of what became known as the Golden Age of Argentine Cinema.

Cast
Hugo del Carril as Carlos Gardel 
 Delia Garcés as Teresa 
 Elsa O'Connor as Dorina 
 Miguel Gómez Bao as Garabito 
 Juana Sujo as Betty 
 Santiago Gómez Cou  
 Armando de Vicente as Pedro  
 Alberto Terrones as Martinez 
 Mario Pardo as Rengo Bazan 
 Salvador Lotito
 Agustín Barrios
 Egle Foropón
Herminia Mancini
Carlos Bertoldi
Amelia Lamarque
Pedro Bibe 
Percival Murray   
 José Herrero

References

Bibliography
 Finkielman, Jorge. The Film Industry in Argentina: An Illustrated Cultural History. McFarland, 2003.
 Rist, Peter H. Historical Dictionary of South American Cinema. Rowman & Littlefield, 2014.

External links

1939 films
Argentine musical films
1930s Spanish-language films
Argentine black-and-white films
Tango films
Films directed by Alberto de Zavalía
1939 musical films
Films set in Buenos Aires
1930s Argentine films